The Colleen Bawn is an 1860 Irish play by Dion Boucicault.

The Colleen Bawn may also refer to:

 local nickname of Ellen Scanlan (1803–1819), Irish murder victim who was the inspiration of the play and its film adaptations:
 The Colleen Bawn (1911 American film), directed by Sidney Olcott
 The Colleen Bawn (1911 Australian film), directed by Gaston Mervale
 The Colleen Bawn (1924 film), a British production directed by W.P. Kellino

See also
 Colleen Bawn, a town in Zimbabwe